"Don't Be a Stranger" is a song by British singer-songwriter Dina Carroll, released on 4 October 1993 as the sixth and final single from her debut album, So Close (1993). The record was produced by Nigel Lowis, and the strings on the track were performed by the London Session Orchestra. It was a success in the United Kingdom, reaching number three on the UK Singles Chart, and it also reached the top 30 in Ireland and Sweden. On the Eurochart Hot 100, the song peaked at number 11 in November 1993, while outside Europe, it was a number-one hit in Israel. Its accompanying music video was directed by Marcus Nispel.

Critical reception
Scottish Aberdeen Evening Express stated that "Don't Be a Stranger" is "sure to be a huge hit." Jon O'Brien from AllMusic called it "epic". In his weekly UK chart commentary, James Masterton described it as "a string laden Las-Vegassy ballad". Alan Jones from Music Week gave it four out of five, writing, "Accompanied by a 40-piece orchestra, Carroll turns in a powerful vocal on a dramatic ballad, which makes full use of its expensive accompaniment." In an retrospective review, Pop Rescue viewed it as "wonderful and absolutely faultless", noting that the singer's vocals are "rich, strong, and flawless." They added that "it was clear that this belter of a song would push her towards recording more big ballads." Phil Shanklin of ReviewsRevues deemed it a "gem from its dramatic introduction", with "a build up that Celine Dion would have been proud of." He concluded, "This is Dina’s best moment."

Music video
A black-and-white music video was shot to accompany the song in Prague, Czech Republic, featuring such landmarks as Charles Bridge and St. Vitus Cathedral; it was directed by German feature film director and producer Marcus Nispel.

Track listings

Charts

Weekly charts

Year-end charts

Sales and certifications

References

1990s ballads
1993 singles
1993 songs
A&M Records singles
Black-and-white music videos
Dina Carroll songs
First Avenue Records singles
Music videos directed by Marcus Nispel
Number-one singles in Israel
Pop ballads